FC Olimp Comrat is a Moldovan football club based in Comrat, Moldova. They play in the Divizia A, the second tier of Moldovan football.

Honours
Divizia B
Winners (1): 2019

Stadium
Olimp Comrat will play their home matches at the Comrat Stadium which is due to open in spring 2021. It has a capacity of 5,000 spectators. Previously, the club played their home matches in Ceadîr-Lunga.

Recent seasons

References

External links
FC Olimp Comrat on divizia-a.md 
FC Olimp Comrat on Soccerway

Football clubs in Moldova
Football clubs in Gagauzia
Association football clubs established in 2013
2013 establishments in Moldova